Steel Butterfly is a 2012 Russian crime film directed by Renat Davletyarov.

Plot 
Runaway street children led by Chuma rob various people in order to survive. Suddenly they were caught by the police and now Chuma is forced to become the bait for a serial killer.

Cast 
 Darya Melnikova as Vika Chumakova
 Anatoliy Beliy as Grigoriy Khanin
 Darya Moroz as Tatyana
 Pyotr Vins as Kosovskiy
 Andrey Kazakov as Zaytsev
 Elena Galibina as Tamara Nikolaevna
 Maksim Dromashko as Tolik
 Andrey Lebedev as Bondarev
 Konstantin Topolaga as Lieutenant Colonel Timashov
 Semyon Treskunov as 'Dwarf'

References

External links 
 

2012 films
2010s Russian-language films
2012 crime films
Films directed by Renat Davletyarov
2012 crime drama films
2010s mystery drama films
Russian crime drama films
Russian mystery films
Biographical films about serial killers